Townshend Landscape Architects are a London-based Landscape Architecture practice established in 1988 by Robert Townshend. The practice specialises in landscape architecture, public realm masterplanning and urban design in the UK, Europe, Middle East, and Far East.

Projects of note include More London, a mixed-use development including the City Hall offices designed by Foster and Partners on the southern bank of the Thames between London Bridge and Tower Bridge, the design of the open spaces and infrastructure at Brindleyplace in Birmingham, Bishops Square public realm and roof terraces, and are joint masterplaners for King's Cross Central masterplan with Allies and Morrison and Demetri Porphyrios for the  brownfield site to the north of King's Cross and St Pancras Stations which includes Granary Square.

Gallery

Selected projects

 More London, London
 King's Cross Central, London
 Spitalfields, London
 Brindleyplace, Birmingham
 Granary Square, London
 The Crystal, London
 Corvin Promenade, Budapest, Hungary
 Metropole, Warsaw, Poland
 Château de Villandry, France
 Carter Lane, St Paul's Cathedral, London
 Tower Place, London
 Bluewater Shopping Centre, Kent
 Central Spine, Manchester
 Bankside 123, London
 Ropemaker Roof Terraces, London
 Abu Dhabi Investment Council Headquarters, Abu Dhabi, United Arab Emirates
 Esplanade Quarter, Jersey
 Plaza of Nations, Vancouver, Canada

Awards

 2000 Civic Trust Award - Central Square & Oozells Square, Brindley Place
 2005 London Planning Awards, Best Built Project contributing to London's Future - Bishops Square, London
 2007 London Planning Awards, The Mayor's Award for Excellence in Planning - King's Cross Central
 2007 London Planning Awards, Best New Public Space - Bishops Square, London

References

External links 
Townshend Landscape Architects Website

Architecture firms based in London
British landscape architects
Design companies established in 1988